Savignia harmsi is a species of sheet weaver found in Spain. It was described by Wunderlich in 1980.

References

Linyphiidae
Spiders of Europe
Spiders described in 1980